Sarayan (also Romanized as Sarāyān, Sarā’īān and Sīryān) is a city in, and the capital of, Sarayan County, South Khorasan Province, Iran. At the 2006 census, its population was 11,098, in 2,933 families.

References 

Populated places in Sarayan County
Cities in South Khorasan Province